Hamed Ahangi Moghaddam (born July 8, 1979) is an Iranian comedian, host, actor and director. He is best known for his talk show Ahangi Night (2021–2022) for which he earned a Hafez Award nomination.

Early life and career 
In 1993 at the age of 14, Hamed Ahangi joined Bandar Anzali theater groups, and a few years later, he won the Academy Award for acting in the province's student theater for his role in a drama play directed by Mohammad Ali Entezari. In 2001, along with Reza Nazari, he started working on the Night War program, and as a writer and director, he performed various plays, including Adventurous Journey, Concours, Satellite, Classroom, Random Groom, and Fake Secretary.

The beginning of professional music work was formed in 2002 with the invitation of Baran Network; he experienced working with television and made various programs for the network over the years. In 2010, at the invitation of Hamid Khandan, he joined the Kish Nights program and performed the program on Kish Island on a monthly basis. After the introduction of stand-up comedy in the family program in 2016, he started performing a stand-up program in Khandvaneh and became famous.

Filmography

Film

Web

Television

Awards and nominations

See also 

 Iranian stand-up comedy

References

External links 

 
 

1979 births
Living people
Iranian comedians
Iranian male film actors
Iranian stand-up comedians
People from Bandar-e Anzali
Iranian male television actors
Iranian television talk show hosts